The Passover Plot is a 1976 drama film adapted from the conspiratorial 1965 book of the same name by Hugh J. Schonfield.  It was directed by Michael Campus and stars Zalman King as Yeshua (Jesus), Harry Andrews, Hugh Griffith, Dan Hedaya, Donald Pleasence and Scott Wilson.

Awards
The Passover Plot was nominated for an Oscar for Best Costume Design (Mary Wills).

References

External links
 
 

1976 drama films
1976 films
Films scored by Alex North
Films based on non-fiction books
Israeli drama films
Portrayals of Jesus in film
Films directed by Michael Campus
Golan-Globus films
1970s English-language films